Panagarh–Morgram Highway  runs from the junction with NH 19 at Panagarh Darjeeling Mor to NH 12 at Morgram. It passes through Kanksa, Ilambazar, Hetampur, Dubrajpur, Suri, Rampurhat, Nalhati and Lohapur.

Junctions

At Ilambazar, it meets the Bolpur-Santiniketan Road. At Dubrajpur it meets two roads – one coming from Raniganj Punjabi Mor and an alternative road coming from Suri via Bakreshwar. At Suri, the headquarters of Birbhum district, several roads converge – one from Bolpur-Santiniketan (State Highway 6), one from Sainthia, and an alternative road from Dubrajpur via Bakreshwar, which also branches off to Rajnagar(State Highway 6). The road to Dumka via Massanjore Dam meets it at Saharakuri.

Rivers
The highway crosses Ajay River just before entering Ilambazar, Bakreshwar River after Dubrajpur, goes over the Tilpara Barrage across the Mayurakshi River, Dwarka River before Rampurhat and the Brahmani river before Nalhati.

Cost
The highway from Ilambazar to Moragram was constructed by AFCONS at a cost of $150-million funded by Asian Development Bank.

References

External links

See also
 List of National Highways in India
 List of National Highways in India (by Highway Number)
 National Highways Development Project

Roads in West Bengal
State Highways in West Bengal